The striated antbird (Drymophila devillei) is a species of bird in the family Thamnophilidae, the antbirds. It is found in the western and south-central Amazon in South America. As presently defined, it has two subspecies: the nominate subspecies in the west, and D. d. subochracea in the south-central Amazon. The latter is sometimes known as the Xingu antbird, but this leads to confusion with Willisornis vidua.

Range in Amazon South America
The striated antbird has one large continuous range in the Amazon Basin's southwest as well as the south-central area in the countries of southeastern Peru, northwestern Bolivia and Brazil. The range is bifurcated in Bolivia, with the northwestern birds in the headwater river basins of the Madeira River of Brazil's Amazonas state, and the eastern Bolivian birds in the headwaters of the Guaporé River, the Bolivian-Brazilian border river flowing westward into the Madeira. An extension of the western Bolivian range reaches southeastward into central Bolivia.

A disjunct population of the striated antbird, is in a strip, 100 km wide by 400 km in northern Ecuador, and extreme southwestern Colombia.

The southern tributary rivers to the Amazon that are in the species' range are the Madeira River and the Purús and Juruá Rivers to the west. The eastward limit of the range is the Tapajós and its headwaters bordering the Cerrado's northwest limits.

See also
Drymophila Genera range write-up

References

External links

striated antbird
Birds of the Amazon Basin
Birds of Peru
Birds of Bolivia
Birds of Ecuador
striated antbird
striated antbird
Taxonomy articles created by Polbot